Ron Crane is an American politician who served as a member of Idaho House of Representatives from 1982 to 1998 and as the state treasurer of Idaho from 1999 to 2019.

Early life and education 
Crane was born in Nampa, Idaho, in 1948. He graduated Nampa Christian High School. In 1971, Crane earned an Associate of Arts degree from the Bible Missionary Institute. In 2008, Crane earned an honorary doctorate degree from Ohio Christian University.

Career 
From 1971 to 1977, Crane served in the Idaho National Guard.

In 1980, Crane became the owner and operator of Crane Alarm Service, an alarm company in Idaho.

In 1982, Crane was elected to the Idaho House of Representatives. During his tenure, Crane represented the 10A district.

On November 3, 1998, Crane won the election and became the state treasurer of Idaho. Crane defeated Latham Williams with 75.5% of the votes. In January 2018, Crane announced that he would not seek re-election to a sixth term as the state's treasurer in the November 2018 elections. Crane left office in January 2019.

Electoral history

Awards 
 1975 Idaho's Soldier of the Year.
 Guardian of Small Business Award. Presented by National Federation of Independent Business (NFIB).
 Legislative Champion of the Family. Presented by Idaho Family Forum.
 1998 Friend of Life Award. Presented by Idaho Chooses Life for his leadership in securing a Ban on Partial Abortions in Idaho.
 Vision 2000 Award. Presented by US Small Business Administration.

Personal life 
Crane's wife is Cheryl Crane. They have six children. Crane and his family live in Nampa, Idaho. In October 2011, at age 62, Crane underwent a successful triple bypass open heart surgery.

References

External links 
 Ron G. Crane at bloomberg.com
 Ron Crane at mastercard.com
 Ron Crane at linkedin.com
 Ron Crane at ballotpedia.org
 Crane, Ron G. at ourcampaigns.com
 Ron Crane at idahostatejournal.com (April 3, 2019)

1948 births
21st-century American politicians
Idaho Republicans
Living people
People from Nampa, Idaho
State cabinet secretaries of Idaho